Iniistius umbrilatus, the razor wrasse fish, is a species of marine ray-finned fish from the family Labridae, the wrasses. It is found in the Eastern Central Pacific Ocean.
  

References

umbrilatus
Taxa named by Oliver Peebles Jenkins
Fish described in 1901